Henry River, a perennial stream of the Clarence River catchment, is located in the Northern Tablelands district of New South Wales, Australia.

Course and features
Henry River rises below Mitchell Hill, on the slopes of the Great Dividing Range, near Bald Nob and flows generally east and north, before reaching its confluence with the Mann River, near Newton Boyd. The river descends  over its  course; and flows through the Mann River Nature Reserve.

See also

 Rivers of New South Wales

References

 

Rivers of New South Wales
Northern Tablelands